Earthquake Memorial Bridge, also known as Zulfiqar Ali Bhutto Bridge and Naluchi Bridge is a 474 meter long cable-stayed extradosed bridge in Muzaffarabad, connecting Naluchi and Chattar on the banks of Jhelum River. The bridge, costing over Rs. 1.5 billion, was funded by Japan Bank for International Cooperation and was completed in August 2014 after meeting delays. It features two lanes and sidewalks on either side. The bridge is 15 meters wide in total.

References

Extradosed bridges
Extradosed bridges in Pakistan
Bridges in Pakistan
Bridges over the Jhelum River
Buildings and structures in Azad Kashmir
Japan–Pakistan relations